Presentation at the Temple is a 1554-1556 oil on canvas painting by Tintoretto, painted for the church of Santa Maria dei Crociferi and now in the Gallerie dell'Accademia, in Venice. It was commissioned by the Scuola dei Bottari, which is referenced by a small barrel or botte on the steps below the altar.

References

External links 
  
  
  
 

1556 paintings
Paintings by Tintoretto
Paintings in the Gallerie dell'Accademia
Tintoretto